Aalmaaraattam is a 1978 Indian Malayalam film, directed by P. Venu. The film stars Vincent, K. P. Ummer, Sudheer and Sadhana in the lead roles. The film has musical score by M. K. Arjunan.

Cast
Jose Prakash 
K. P. Ummer
Sudheer
Vincent
Ravikumar 
Sadhana 
Vijayalalitha
Chandrakala

Soundtrack
The music was composed by M. K. Arjunan and the lyrics were written by P. Venu and Konniyoor Bhas.

References

External links
 

1978 films
1970s Malayalam-language films
Films directed by P. Venu